Shahdad-e Kahir (also Romanized as Shahdād-e Kahīr; also known as Kahīr and Kahīr Shahdād) is a village in Kahir Rural District, in the Central District of Konarak County, Sistan and Baluchestan Province, Iran. At the 2006 census, its population was 560, in 115 families.

References 

Populated places in Konarak County